Barry McCrea (born 15 October 1974) is an Irish writer and academic.  He grew up in Dalkey, County Dublin, and was educated at Gonzaga College, and Trinity College, Dublin (1993–1997) where he studied French and Spanish literature. He received a Ph.D. from Princeton University in 2004.  He taught Comparative Literature at Yale University, where he was appointed full professor in 2012.  He is currently professor of literature at the University of Notre Dame where he teaches at its campuses in Dublin and Rome.

His novel The First Verse was published by Carroll & Graf in 2005.  It was awarded the 2006 Ferro-Grumley Prize for fiction, and nominated for an American Library Association award. The plot explores the concept of the Sortes Virgilianae.

The First Verse was published in Spanish as Literati (DestinoLibro, 2006) and in German as Die Poeten der Nacht (Aufbau, 2008).

Bibliography
The First Verse (2005)
In the Company of Strangers: Family and Narrative in Dickens, Conan Doyle, Joyce and Proust (2011)
Languages of the Night: Minor Languages and the Literary Imagination in 20th-Century Ireland and Europe (2015)

Further reading
 Allen Randolph, Jody. "Barry McCrea." Close to the Next Moment: Interviews from a Changing Ireland. Manchester: Carcanet, 2010.
 McKeon, Belinda. "Barry McCrea, Novelist." The Irish Times 21 Jan 2006.

References

External links
Yale faculty biography
Review in London Review of Books
Review in Sunday Business Post
Review in Financial Times
Review in the Observer

Irish novelists
Living people
1974 births
People from County Dublin
Princeton University alumni
People from Dalkey
People educated at Gonzaga College
Irish LGBT novelists
Irish gay writers
Gay novelists
Irish male novelists
21st-century LGBT people